Chinnan Chirusugal is a 1982 Indian Tamil-language drama film written and directed by Rama Narayanan. The film stars Mohan, Sulakshana and Prabhu. It was released on 11 December 1982.

Plot

Cast 
 Mohan
 Sulakshana
 Prabhu

Production 
Chinnan Chirusugal was written and directed by Rama Narayanan, and produced by Thenandal Films.

Soundtrack 
The soundtrack was composed by K. V. Mahadevan.

Release and reception 
Chinnan Chirusugal was passed with an "A" (adults only) certificate by the Central Board of Film Certification without any cuts, and was released on 11 December 1982. Ananda Vikatan said the best character in the film was Prabhu, but was dismayed since he appears only mid-way through the film.

References

External links 
 

1980s Tamil-language films
1982 drama films
1982 films
Films directed by Rama Narayanan
Films scored by K. V. Mahadevan
Indian drama films